is a sub-kilometer asteroid, classified as a near-Earth object of the Aten group, that is a temporary horseshoe companion to the Earth. There are dozens of known Earth horseshoe librators, some of which switch periodically between the quasi-satellite and the horseshoe co-orbital states.

Discovery 

 was discovered on 12 August 2020 by L. Denneau, J. Tonry, A. Heinze, and H. Weiland observing
for the ATLAS-HKO Survey. As of 20 January 2021, it has been observed 41 times with an observation arc of 361 days.

Orbit and orbital evolution 
 is currently an Aten asteroid (Earth-crossing but with a period less than a year). Its semi-major axis (currently 0.998105754 AU) is similar to that of Earth (0.999789 AU), but it has a moderate eccentricity (0.1269557) and low orbital inclination (4.80807°). It alternates between being an Aten asteroid and being an Apollo asteroid, although its orbital evolution is not fully stable and it can be considered as a temporary co-orbital companion to the Earth.

Physical properties 

With an absolute magnitude of 25.5 mag, it has a diameter in the range 10–50 meters (for an assumed albedo range of 0.04–0.20, respectively).

Exploration 

 will be explored by a Chinese mission of planetary defense including an impactor and a separate orbiter planned to launch in 2026.

See also 

 54509 YORP
 
 3753 Cruithne

Notes 

  This is assuming an albedo of 0.20–0.04.

References 

Further reading
 Understanding the Distribution of Near-Earth Asteroids Bottke, W. F., Jedicke, R., Morbidelli, A., Petit, J.-M., Gladman, B. 2000, Science, Vol. 288, Issue 5474, pp. 2190–2194.
 A Numerical Survey of Transient Co-orbitals of the Terrestrial Planets Christou, A. A. 2000, Icarus, Vol. 144, Issue 1, pp. 1–20.
 Debiased Orbital and Absolute Magnitude Distribution of the Near-Earth Objects Bottke, W. F., Morbidelli, A., Jedicke, R., Petit, J.-M., Levison, H. F., Michel, P., Metcalfe, T. S. 2002, Icarus, Vol. 156, Issue 2, pp. 399–433.
 Transient co-orbital asteroids Brasser, R., Innanen, K. A., Connors, M., Veillet, C., Wiegert, P., Mikkola, S., Chodas, P. W. 2004, Icarus, Vol. 171, Issue 1, pp. 102–109.
 A trio of horseshoes: past, present and future dynamical evolution of Earth co-orbital asteroids 2015 XX169, 2015 YA and 2015 YQ1 de la Fuente Marcos, C., de la Fuente Marcos, R. 2016, Astrophysics and Space Science, Vol. 361, Issue 4, article 121 (13 pp).

External links 
 Discovery MPEC 
  data at MPC
 
 
 

Minor planet object articles (unnumbered)
Discoveries by ATLAS
Earth-crossing asteroids

20200812